AppHarvest, Inc. is an American food production company developing and operating indoor farms in Appalachia. The company operates a 60-acre tomato farm in Morehead, Kentucky, with plans to operate an additional 3 farms across Kentucky.

Founded by Jonathan Webb, the company aims to use Kentucky's central geographic location to reduce carbon emissions, delivering produce to Midwest and East Coast markets. AppHarvest's greenhouses aim to primarily use sunlight in lieu of LEDs for growing plants hydroponically. 

The company became publicly listed after a merger with special purpose acquisition company Novus Capital Corp in 2020.

Locations 

 Morehead (60 acres)
 Berea (15 acres)
 Richmond (60 acres)
 Somerset (30 acres)

References 

Experimental farms in the United States
Farms in Kentucky
Agriculture companies established in 2017
Companies based in Kentucky
American companies established in 2017
Companies listed on the Nasdaq
B Lab-certified corporations
Rowan County, Kentucky